This is a list of butterflies of Mozambique. About 433 species are known from Mozambique, three of which are endemic.

Papilionidae

Papilioninae

Papilionini
Papilio nireus lyaeus Doubleday, 1845
Papilio dardanus cenea Stoll, 1790
Papilio constantinus Ward, 1871
Papilio demodocus Esper, [1798]
Papilio echerioides chirindanus van Son, 1956
Papilio ophidicephalus chirinda van Son, 1939

Leptocercini
Graphium antheus (Cramer, 1779)
Graphium policenes (Cramer, 1775)
Graphium junodi (Trimen, 1893)
Graphium polistratus (Grose-Smith, 1889)
Graphium colonna (Ward, 1873)
Graphium porthaon (Hewitson, 1865)
Graphium angolanus (Goeze, 1779)
Graphium endochus (Boisduval, 1836)
Graphium morania (Angas, 1849)
Graphium leonidas (Fabricius, 1793)
Graphium philonoe (Ward, 1873)

Pieridae

Coliadinae
Eurema brigitta (Stoll, [1780])
Eurema desjardinsii marshalli (Butler, 1898)
Eurema regularis (Butler, 1876)
Eurema hapale (Mabille, 1882)
Eurema hecabe solifera (Butler, 1875)
Catopsilia florella (Fabricius, 1775)
Colias electo (Linnaeus, 1763)

Pierinae
Colotis amata calais (Cramer, 1775)
Colotis antevippe gavisa (Wallengren, 1857)
Colotis auxo (Lucas, 1852)
Colotis celimene amina (Hewitson, 1866)
Colotis danae annae (Wallengren, 1857)
Colotis dissociatus (Butler, 1897)
Colotis euippe omphale (Godart, 1819)
Colotis eunoma (Hopffer, 1855)
Colotis evagore antigone (Boisduval, 1836)
Colotis evenina evenina (Wallengren, 1857)
Colotis evenina casta (Gerstaecker, 1871)
Colotis ione (Godart, 1819)
Colotis pallene (Hopffer, 1855)
Colotis regina (Trimen, 1863)
Colotis vesta argillaceus (Butler, 1877)
Colotis vesta mutans (Butler, 1877)
Colotis eris (Klug, 1829)
Colotis subfasciatus (Swainson, 1833)
Colotis agoye (Wallengren, 1857)
Eronia cleodora Hübner, 1823
Eronia leda (Boisduval, 1847)
Pinacopterix eriphia (Godart, [1819])
Nepheronia argia mhondana (Suffert, 1904)
Nepheronia argia variegata Henning, 1994
Nepheronia buquetii (Boisduval, 1836)
Leptosia alcesta inalcesta Bernardi, 1959

Pierini
Appias epaphia contracta (Butler, 1888)
Appias lasti (Grose-Smith, 1889)
Appias sabina phoebe (Butler, 1901)
Pontia helice (Linnaeus, 1764)
Mylothris agathina (Cramer, 1779)
Mylothris rubricosta (Mabille, 1890)
Mylothris rueppellii haemus (Trimen, 1879)
Mylothris rueppellii rhodesiana Riley, 1921
Mylothris sagala umtaliana d'Abrera, 1980
Mylothris yulei Butler, 1897
Dixeia charina charina (Boisduval, 1836)
Dixeia charina simana (Hopffer, 1855)
Dixeia doxo parva Talbot, 1943
Dixeia leucophanes Vári, 1976
Dixeia pigea (Boisduval, 1836)
Dixeia spilleri (Spiller, 1884)
Belenois aurota (Fabricius, 1793)
Belenois creona severina (Stoll, 1781)
Belenois gidica abyssinica (Lucas, 1852)
Belenois thysa (Hopffer, 1855)
Belenois zochalia (Boisduval, 1836)

Lycaenidae

Miletinae

Liphyrini
Aslauga marshalli Butler, 1899

Miletini
Lachnocnema bibulus (Fabricius, 1793)
Lachnocnema durbani Trimen & Bowker, 1887
Lachnocnema brimoides Libert, 1996

Poritiinae

Liptenini
Alaena nyassa Hewitson, 1877
Pentila swynnertoni Stempffer & Bennett, 1961
Pentila tropicalis fuscipunctata Henning & Henning, 1994
Ornipholidotos peucetia (Hewitson, 1866)
Teriomima puella Kirby, 1887
Teriomima puellaris (Trimen, 1894)
Teriomima williami Henning & Henning, 2004 (endemic)
Teriomima parva Hawker-Smith, 1933
Euthecta cooksoni Bennett, 1954
Baliochila aslanga (Trimen, 1873)
Baliochila barnesi Stempffer & Bennett, 1953
Baliochila neavei Stempffer & Bennett, 1953
Baliochila lipara Stempffer & Bennett, 1953
Cnodontes pallida (Trimen, 1898)
Cnodontes penningtoni Bennett, 1954

Epitolini
Cephetola australis Libert, 1999 (endemic)
Deloneura millari dondoensis Pennington, 1953
Deloneura sheppardi Stevenson, 1934

Aphnaeinae
Lipaphnaeus aderna spindasoides (Aurivillius, 1916)
Chloroselas pseudozeritis (Trimen, 1873)
Crudaria leroma (Wallengren, 1857)
Cigaritis apelles (Oberthür, 1878)
Cigaritis ella (Hewitson, 1865)
Cigaritis homeyeri (Dewitz, 1887)
Cigaritis mozambica (Bertoloni, 1850)
Cigaritis natalensis (Westwood, 1851)
Cigaritis nyassae (Butler, 1884)
Cigaritis phanes (Trimen, 1873)
Cigaritis victoriae (Butler, 1884)
Axiocerses tjoane (Wallengren, 1857)
Axiocerses coalescens Henning & Henning, 1996
Axiocerses amanga (Westwood, 1881)
Axiocerses punicea cruenta (Trimen, 1894)
Aloeides aranda (Wallengren, 1857)
Aloeides damarensis mashona Tite & Dickson, 1973
Aloeides taikosama (Wallengren, 1857)
Aphnaeus erikssoni rex Aurivillius, 1909
Aphnaeus hutchinsonii Trimen & Bowker, 1887

Theclinae
Myrina dermaptera (Wallengren, 1857)
Myrina silenus ficedula Trimen, 1879
Hypolycaena buxtoni Hewitson, 1874
Hypolycaena philippus (Fabricius, 1793)
Hypolycaena tearei Henning, 1981
Hemiolaus caeculus (Hopffer, 1855)
Leptomyrina hirundo (Wallengren, 1857)
Leptomyrina gorgias sobrina Talbot, 1935
Iolaus alienus Trimen, 1898
Iolaus bakeri (Riley, 1928)
Iolaus mimosae rhodosense (Stempffer & Bennett, 1959)
Iolaus sidus Trimen, 1864
Iolaus violacea (Riley, 1928)
Iolaus pallene (Wallengren, 1857)
Iolaus trimeni Wallengren, 1875
Iolaus lalos (Druce, 1896)
Iolaus silarus Druce, 1885
Iolaus poultoni (Riley, 1928)
Stugeta bowkeri tearei Dickson, 1980
Pilodeudorix obscurata (Trimen, 1891)
Pilodeudorix zeloides (Butler, 1901)
Deudorix antalus (Hopffer, 1855)
Deudorix caliginosa Lathy, 1903
Deudorix dariaves Hewitson, 1877
Deudorix dinochares Grose-Smith, 1887
Deudorix dinomenes Grose-Smith, 1887
Deudorix diocles Hewitson, 1869
Deudorix lorisona coffea Jackson, 1966

Polyommatinae

Lycaenesthini
Anthene amarah (Guérin-Méneville, 1849)
Anthene butleri livida (Trimen, 1881)
Anthene definita (Butler, 1899)
Anthene kersteni (Gerstaecker, 1871)
Anthene lasti (Grose-Smith & Kirby, 1894)
Anthene lemnos (Hewitson, 1878)
Anthene liodes (Hewitson, 1874)
Anthene lunulata (Trimen, 1894)
Anthene otacilia (Trimen, 1868)
Anthene sheppardi Stevenson, 1940

Polyommatini
Cupidopsis cissus (Godart, [1824])
Cupidopsis jobates (Hopffer, 1855)
Uranothauma antinorii felthami (Stevenson, 1934)
Uranothauma falkensteini (Dewitz, 1879)
Uranothauma nubifer (Trimen, 1895)
Uranothauma poggei (Dewitz, 1879)
Uranothauma vansomereni Stempffer, 1951
Cacyreus lingeus (Stoll, 1782)
Cacyreus marshalli Butler, 1898
Cacyreus tespis (Herbst, 1804)
Leptotes babaulti (Stempffer, 1935)
Leptotes pulchra (Murray, 1874)
Tuxentius calice (Hopffer, 1855)
Tuxentius melaena (Trimen & Bowker, 1887)
Tarucus sybaris (Hopffer, 1855)
Zizeeria knysna (Trimen, 1862)
Actizera lucida (Trimen, 1883)
Zizula hylax (Fabricius, 1775)
Brephidium metophis (Wallengren, 1860)
Azanus jesous (Guérin-Méneville, 1849)
Azanus mirza (Plötz, 1880)
Azanus moriqua (Wallengren, 1857)
Eicochrysops hippocrates (Fabricius, 1793)
Eicochrysops messapus mahallakoaena (Wallengren, 1857)
Euchrysops barkeri (Trimen, 1893)
Euchrysops dolorosa (Trimen & Bowker, 1887)
Euchrysops malathana (Boisduval, 1833)
Euchrysops osiris (Hopffer, 1855)
Thermoniphas colorata (Ungemach, 1932)
Oboronia bueronica Karsch, 1895
Freyeria trochylus (Freyer, [1843])
Lepidochrysops aethiopia (Bethune-Baker, [1923])
Lepidochrysops delicata (Bethune-Baker, [1923])
Lepidochrysops intermedia (Bethune-Baker, [1923])
Lepidochrysops kocak Seven, 1997
Lepidochrysops neavei (Bethune-Baker, [1923])
Lepidochrysops patricia (Trimen & Bowker, 1887)
Lepidochrysops peculiaris hypoleucus (Butler, 1893)
Lepidochrysops plebeia (Butler, 1898)

Nymphalidae

Libytheinae
Libythea labdaca laius Trimen, 1879

Danainae

Danaini
Danaus chrysippus orientis (Aurivillius, 1909)
Tirumala petiverana (Doubleday, 1847)
Amauris niavius dominicanus Trimen, 1879
Amauris albimaculata albimaculata Butler, 1875
Amauris albimaculata chirindana Talbot, 1941
Amauris echeria lobengula (Sharpe, 1890)
Amauris ochlea (Boisduval, 1847)

Satyrinae

Melanitini
Gnophodes betsimena diversa (Butler, 1880)
Melanitis leda (Linnaeus, 1758)
Melanitis libya Distant, 1882

Satyrini
Bicyclus angulosa selousi (Trimen, 1895)
Bicyclus anynana (Butler, 1879)
Bicyclus campina (Aurivillius, 1901)
Bicyclus ena (Hewitson, 1877)
Bicyclus safitza (Westwood, 1850)
Heteropsis perspicua (Trimen, 1873)
Heteropsis simonsii (Butler, 1877)
Ypthima antennata van Son, 1955
Ypthima condamini Kielland, 1982
Ypthima granulosa Butler, 1883
Ypthima impura paupera Ungemach, 1932
Ypthima pupillaris Butler, 1888
Ypthimomorpha itonia (Hewitson, 1865)
Coenyra hebe (Trimen, 1862)
Physcaeneura panda (Boisduval, 1847)
Physcaeneura pione Godman, 1880
Pseudonympha cyclops van Son, 1955
Stygionympha wichgrafi lannini van Son, 1966

Charaxinae

Charaxini
Charaxes varanes varanes (Cramer, 1777)
Charaxes varanes vologeses (Mabille, 1876)
Charaxes candiope (Godart, 1824)
Charaxes protoclea azota (Hewitson, 1877)
Charaxes macclounii Butler, 1895
Charaxes jasius saturnus Butler, 1866
Charaxes castor flavifasciatus Butler, 1895
Charaxes brutus natalensis Staudinger, 1885
Charaxes pollux gazanus van Someren, 1967
Charaxes druceanus stevensoni van Someren, 1963
Charaxes bohemani Felder & Felder, 1859
Charaxes cithaeron Felder & Felder, 1859
Charaxes violetta violetta Grose-Smith, 1885
Charaxes violetta melloni Fox, 1963
Charaxes etesipe tavetensis Rothschild, 1894
Charaxes achaemenes Felder & Felder, 1867
Charaxes jahlusa argynnides Westwood, 1864
Charaxes baumanni whytei Butler, 1894
Charaxes chintechi van Someren, 1975
Charaxes pseudophaeus van Someren, 1975
Charaxes manica Trimen, 1894
Charaxes phaeus Hewitson, 1877
Charaxes guderiana (Dewitz, 1879)
Charaxes zoolina (Westwood, [1850])
Charaxes nichetes leoninus Butler, 1895

Euxanthini
Charaxes wakefieldi (Ward, 1873)

Apaturinae
Apaturopsis cleochares schultzei Schmidt, 1921

Nymphalinae

Nymphalini
Vanessa cardui (Linnaeus, 1758)
Junonia artaxia Hewitson, 1864
Junonia hierta cebrene Trimen, 1870
Junonia natalica (Felder & Felder, 1860)
Junonia oenone (Linnaeus, 1758)
Junonia orithya madagascariensis Guenée, 1865
Junonia terea elgiva Hewitson, 1864
Salamis cacta eileenae Henning & Joannou, 1994
Protogoniomorpha anacardii nebulosa (Trimen, 1881)
Protogoniomorpha parhassus (Drury, 1782)
Precis actia Distant, 1880
Precis ceryne (Boisduval, 1847)
Precis cuama (Hewitson, 1864)
Precis octavia sesamus Trimen, 1883
Precis sinuata Plötz, 1880
Hypolimnas anthedon wahlbergi (Wallengren, 1857)
Hypolimnas deceptor (Trimen, 1873)
Hypolimnas misippus (Linnaeus, 1764)

Cyrestinae

Cyrestini
Cyrestis camillus sublineata Lathy, 1901

Biblidinae

Biblidini
Byblia anvatara acheloia (Wallengren, 1857)
Byblia ilithyia (Drury, 1773)
Mesoxantha ethosea reducta Rothschild, 1918
Neptidopsis fulgurata platyptera Rothschild & Jordan, 1903
Neptidopsis ophione nucleata Grünberg, 1911
Eurytela dryope angulata Aurivillius, 1899
Eurytela hiarbas lita Rothschild & Jordan, 1903

Epicaliini
Sevenia boisduvali (Wallengren, 1857)
Sevenia garega (Karsch, 1892)
Sevenia morantii (Trimen, 1881)
Sevenia natalensis (Boisduval, 1847)
Sevenia rosa (Hewitson, 1877)

Limenitinae

Limenitidini
Cymothoe coranus Grose-Smith, 1889
Cymothoe vumbui Bethune-Baker, 1926
Pseudacraea boisduvalii trimenii Butler, 1874
Pseudacraea lucretia expansa (Butler, 1878)

Neptidini
Neptis alta Overlaet, 1955
Neptis carcassoni Van Son, 1959
Neptis goochii Trimen, 1879
Neptis gratiosa Overlaet, 1955
Neptis jordani Neave, 1910
Neptis kiriakoffi Overlaet, 1955
Neptis laeta Overlaet, 1955
Neptis penningtoni van Son, 1977
Neptis saclava marpessa Hopffer, 1855
Neptis serena Overlaet, 1955
Neptis swynnertoni Trimen, 1912
Neptis trigonophora Butler, 1878

Adoliadini
Euryphura concordia (Hopffer, 1855)
Hamanumida daedalus (Fabricius, 1775)
Pseudargynnis hegemone (Godart, 1819)
Aterica galene theophane Hopffer, 1855
Bebearia orientis malawiensis Holmes, 2001
Euphaedra orientalis Rothschild, 1898
Euphaedra neophron (Hopffer, 1855)
Euptera kinugnana (Grose-Smith, 1889)

Heliconiinae

Acraeini
Acraea cerasa Hewitson, 1861
Acraea acara Hewitson, 1865
Acraea anemosa Hewitson, 1865
Acraea boopis Wichgraf, 1914
Acraea cuva Grose-Smith, 1889
Acraea insignis gorongozae van Son, 1963
Acraea machequena Grose-Smith, 1887
Acraea neobule Doubleday, 1847
Acraea rabbaiae rabbaiae Ward, 1873
Acraea rabbaiae perlucida Henning & Henning, 1996
Acraea satis Ward, 1871
Acraea acrita Hewitson, 1865
Acraea asema Hewitson, 1877
Acraea dondoensis Stevenson, 1934 (endemic)
Acraea egina areca Mabille, 1889
Acraea nohara Boisduval, 1847
Acraea petraea Boisduval, 1847
Acraea violarum Boisduval, 1847
Acraea aglaonice Westwood, 1881
Acraea axina Westwood, 1881
Acraea caldarena Hewitson, 1877
Acraea natalica Boisduval, 1847
Acraea oncaea Hopffer, 1855
Acraea aganice Hewitson, 1852
Acraea acerata Hewitson, 1874
Acraea cabira Hopffer, 1855
Acraea encedana Pierre, 1976
Acraea encedon (Linnaeus, 1758)
Acraea serena (Fabricius, 1775)
Acraea esebria Hewitson, 1861
Acraea johnstoni Godman, 1885
Acraea burni Butler, 1896
Acraea pentapolis epidica Oberthür, 1893
Acraea pharsalus pharsaloides Holland, 1892
Acraea rahira Boisduval, 1833
Acraea conradti Oberthür, 1893
Acraea igola Trimen & Bowker, 1889
Pardopsis punctatissima (Boisduval, 1833)

Vagrantini
Lachnoptera ayresii Trimen, 1879
Phalanta phalantha aethiopica (Rothschild & Jordan, 1903)

Hesperiidae

Coeliadinae
Coeliades anchises (Gerstaecker, 1871)
Coeliades forestan (Stoll, [1782])
Coeliades libeon (Druce, 1875)
Coeliades lorenzo Evans, 1947
Coeliades pisistratus (Fabricius, 1793)

Pyrginae

Celaenorrhinini
Celaenorrhinus bettoni Butler, 1902
Celaenorrhinus mokeezi separata (Strand, 1911)
Eretis djaelaelae (Wallengren, 1857)
Eretis melania Mabille, 1891
Eretis umbra nox (Neave, 1910)
Sarangesa maculata (Mabille, 1891)
Sarangesa motozi (Wallengren, 1857)
Sarangesa phidyle (Walker, 1870)
Sarangesa ruona Evans, 1937
Sarangesa seineri Strand, 1909

Tagiadini
Tagiades flesus (Fabricius, 1781)
Eagris nottoana (Wallengren, 1857)
Calleagris jamesoni (Sharpe, 1890)
Caprona pillaana Wallengren, 1857
Netrobalane canopus (Trimen, 1864)
Leucochitonea levubu Wallengren, 1857
Abantis bamptoni Collins & Larsen, 1994
Abantis paradisea (Butler, 1870)
Abantis tettensis Hopffer, 1855
Abantis venosa Trimen & Bowker, 1889
Abantis zambesiaca (Westwood, 1874)

Carcharodini
Spialia asterodia (Trimen, 1864)
Spialia colotes transvaaliae (Trimen & Bowker, 1889)
Spialia confusa Evans, 1937
Spialia delagoae (Trimen, 1898)
Spialia depauperata depauperata (Strand, 1911)
Spialia depauperata australis de Jong, 1978
Spialia diomus ferax (Wallengren, 1863)
Spialia dromus (Plötz, 1884)
Spialia mafa (Trimen, 1870)
Spialia spio (Linnaeus, 1764)
Gomalia elma (Trimen, 1862)

Hesperiinae

Aeromachini
Astictopterus stellata mineni (Trimen, 1894)
Ampittia capenas (Hewitson, 1868)
Kedestes callicles (Hewitson, 1868)
Kedestes macomo (Trimen, 1862)
Kedestes mohozutza (Wallengren, 1857)
Kedestes wallengrenii (Trimen, 1883)
Gorgyra johnstoni (Butler, 1894)
Gorgyra subflavidus Holland, 1896
Teniorhinus harona (Westwood, 1881)
Teniorhinus herilus (Hopffer, 1855)
Acada biseriata (Mabille, 1893)
Parosmodes morantii (Trimen, 1873)
Acleros mackenii (Trimen, 1868)
Acleros ploetzi Mabille, 1890
Semalea arela (Mabille, 1891)
Semalea pulvina (Plötz, 1879)
Andronymus caesar philander (Hopffer, 1855)
Andronymus neander (Plötz, 1884)
Moltena fiara (Butler, 1870)
Chondrolepis niveicornis (Plötz, 1883)
Zophopetes dysmephila (Trimen, 1868)
Artitropa erinnys (Trimen, 1862)
Artitropa reducta Aurivillius, 1925
Fresna nyassae (Hewitson, 1878)
Platylesches affinissima Strand, 1921
Platylesches ayresii (Trimen & Bowker, 1889)
Platylesches galesa (Hewitson, 1877)
Platylesches moritili (Wallengren, 1857)
Platylesches neba (Hewitson, 1877)
Platylesches picanini (Holland, 1894)
Platylesches robustus Neave, 1910
Platylesches shona Evans, 1937

Baorini
Zenonia zeno (Trimen, 1864)
Pelopidas mathias (Fabricius, 1798)
Pelopidas thrax (Hübner, 1821)
Borbo borbonica (Boisduval, 1833)
Borbo chagwa (Evans, 1937)
Borbo detecta (Trimen, 1893)
Borbo fallax (Gaede, 1916)
Borbo fanta (Evans, 1937)
Borbo fatuellus (Hopffer, 1855)
Borbo ferruginea dondo Evans, 1956
Borbo gemella (Mabille, 1884)
Borbo holtzi (Plötz, 1883)
Borbo lugens (Hopffer, 1855)
Borbo micans (Holland, 1896)
Parnara monasi (Trimen & Bowker, 1889)
Gegenes hottentota (Latreille, 1824)
Gegenes niso (Linnaeus, 1764)
Gegenes pumilio gambica (Mabille, 1878)

Heteropterinae
Metisella abdeli (Krüger, 1928)
Metisella aegipan inyanga Evans, 1956
Metisella metis paris Evans, 1937
Metisella willemi (Wallengren, 1857)
Tsitana tsita (Trimen, 1870)

See also
List of moths of Mozambique
Wildlife of Mozambique

References

Seitz, A. Die Gross-Schmetterlinge der Erde 13: Die Afrikanischen Tagfalter. Plates
Seitz, A. Die Gross-Schmetterlinge der Erde 13: Die Afrikanischen Tagfalter. Text 

Mozambique
Mozambique
Butterflies